Mumbai Port Trust (also known as the Bombay Port Trust) is a port which lies midway on the West coast of India, on the natural deep-water harbour of Mumbai (Bombay) in Maharashtra.The harbour spread over  is protected by the mainland of Konkan to its east and north and by the island city of Mumbai to its west. The harbour opens to the south to the Arabian Sea.

The port is administered by the Mumbai Port Trust (MbPT, formerly the Bombay Port Trust (BPT)), an autonomous corporation wholly owned by the Government of India. The port is primarily used for bulk cargo, while most container traffic is directed to Nhava Sheva port across the harbour.

History

Mumbai Harbour has been used by ships and boats for centuries. It was used by the Maratha Navy, as well as the British and Portuguese colonial navies. In 1652, the Surat Council of the East India Company, realising the geographical advantage of the Port, urged its purchase from the Portuguese. Their wish was gratified nine years later when, under the Marriage Treaty between Charles II of Great Britain and the Infant Catherine of Portugal, the ‘Port and Island of Bombay’ were transferred to the king of Great Britain
The first of the present-day docks of the Port were built in the 1870s. Bombay Port Trust (BPT) was established as a corporation on 26 June 1873. BPT's founding chairman was Colonel J.A. Ballard.

Port development was undertaken by the civil engineering partnership Sir John Wolfe-Barry and Lt Col Arthur John Barry as Joint Consulting Engineers to the Bombay Port Trust at the end of the nineteenth century.

From its establishment, the port has been the gateway to India, and was a primary factor in the emergence of Mumbai as the commercial capital of India. The port and the corporation took their present names in the 1990s.

Over the decades, the port underwent tremendous expansion, with the addition of berths and cargo handling capacities. However, Mumbai's expanding growth and population pressure constrained the growth of the port by the 1970s. This led to the establishment of the Nhava Sheva port across Mumbai Harbour in Navi Mumbai on the Konkan mainland. Nhava Sheva began operations in 1989, and most container traffic now flows through Nhava Sheva.
Prince's Dock and Victoria Dock are semi-tidal docks, with vessels docking and departing at high tide. Indira Dock has a lock, enabling vessels to enter or depart at any time.

The port has four jetties on Jawahar Dweep, an island in the harbour, for handling Crude and petroleum products. Liquid chemicals are handled from a jetty on Pirpau.

Ballard Pier Extension has a passenger terminal, including immigration clearance facilities for crews and passengers of cruise liners.

The port has a total of 69 anchorage points. A pilot is mandatory for all vessels of over 100 tonnes net weightage.

See also

 Chhatrapati Shivaji Maharaj International Airport
 Nhava Sheva Port

References

External links 

 

Ports and harbours of Maharashtra
Estuaries of Mumbai
Transport in Mumbai
Companies based in Mumbai
Economy of Mumbai
Economy of Maharashtra